Bridge to Terabithia is a children's novel written by Katherine Paterson, about two children named Leslie and Jesse who create a magical forest kingdom in their imaginations. The book was originally published in 1977 by Thomas Crowell, and in 1978, it won the Newbery Medal. Paterson drew inspiration for the novel from a real event that occurred in August 1974 when her son’s friend was struck dead by lightning.

The novel tells the story of fifth grader Jesse Aarons, who becomes friends with his new neighbor, Leslie Burke, after he loses a footrace to her at school. Leslie is a tomboy from a wealthy family, and Jesse thinks highly of her. Jesse is an artistic boy from a poorer family who, in the beginning, is fearful and angry. After meeting Leslie, however, his life is transformed. He becomes courageous and learns to let go of his frustration. The two children create a kingdom for themselves, which Leslie names "Terabithia."

The novel's content has been the frequent target of censorship and appears at number eight on the American Library Association list of the 100 Most Frequently Challenged Books for the decade 1990–2000.

It has been adapted for the screen twice: a 1985 PBS TV movie and a 2007 Disney/Walden Media feature film.

Background of book

Katherine Paterson lived for a time in Takoma Park, Maryland, a suburb of Washington, D.C. The novel was inspired by an incident during that time: on August 14, 1974, her son David's best friend, Lisa Christina Hill, died after being struck by lightning in Bethany Beach, Delaware. She was eight years old.

The name of the imaginary kingdom is similar to that of the Narnian island Terebinthia, created by C. S. Lewis in 1951 or earlier for Prince Caspian and The Voyage of the Dawn Treader. Paterson observed in 2005:

I thought I had made it up. Then, rereading The Voyage of the Dawn Treader by C. S. Lewis, I realized that I had probably gotten it from the island of Terebinthia in that book. However, Lewis probably got that name from the terebinth tree in the Bible, so both of us pinched from somewhere else, probably unconsciously.

The novel makes a direct reference to The Chronicles of Narnia as a series of books Leslie lends to Jess, in order to help him learn to behave like a king.

The novel also indirectly alludes to the fantasy series The Chronicles of Prydain.

Plot summary
Ten-year-old Jesse "Jess" Aarons has trained all summer to be the fastest runner in his rural school. Secretly, he wants to be an artist, but his father disapproves. He has a crush on the school music teacher, Miss Edmunds, the only person who encourages him to draw.

Jess's new neighbor, Leslie Burke, is a wealthy tomboy from Arlington, Virginia.  At recess on the first day of school, Leslie outruns everyone.  The other students mock her for being a teacher's pet and for not owning a television.  When Jess defends Leslie from Janice Avery, a seventh grade bully, they become friends.  They play by a dry creek behind Leslie's house.  They pretend they are the king and queen of a hidden magical kingdom, Terabithia, that can be entered only by swinging over the creek bed on an old rope.  

When Jess's six-year-old sister May Belle brings Twinkies to school for lunch, Janice Avery steals them.  At Terabithia, Jess and Leslie forge a love letter to Janice from a boy she likes.  The letter asks for a date, and Janice is humiliated when he does not show up.  Months later, Leslie hears Janice crying in the bathroom.  Jess convinces Leslie to help Janice.  Janice tells Leslie that she is abusively beaten by her father, and her so-called friends have just gossipped about it to the entire seventh grade.  Leslie comforts Janice by telling her that everyone will forget about it in a week.  That night, May Belle tells Jess that she followed him and Leslie to the creek.  He makes her swear never to follow them again nor to tell their mother.

On Easter, Leslie goes to church with Jess's family.  While she calls the story of Jesus "beautiful," she doubts it.  This upsets May Belle, who believes God will damn Leslie to hell when she dies.  That week, rain turns the dry creek bed into a rushing river.  By Wednesday evening, Jess is too scared to swing over the river, while Leslie remains unafraid. On Thursday morning, Miss Edmunds calls Jess and invites him to Washington to visit the Smithsonian.  When he returns home, Leslie is dead: The rope broke as she swung over the river, and she drowned.

Jess asks his father whether Leslie is in hell, and his father assures him she isn't.  Using a large branch, Jess crosses the stream to Terabithia, where he makes a funeral wreath for Leslie.  May Belle, who has followed him, makes it halfway across the branch before becoming too scared to continue.  Jess guides her backwards to land.

Jess's teacher, Mrs. Myers, tells him that when her husband died, people tried to make her forget, but she didn't want to.  Using scrap lumber left behind by the Burkes, Jess builds a bridge across the dry creek bed.  He puts flowers in May Belle's hair, leads her across the bridge, and begins to play Terabithia, with May Belle as the new queen.

Characters

 Jesse Aarons – In the beginning of the novel, he is habitually fearful, angry and depressed due to his family struggles. He also has a crush on his music teacher, Miss Edmunds, which plays an integral role in the final events of the story. After meeting and then ultimately losing Leslie, he is transformed, in that he becomes courageous and lets go of his anger and frustration. 
 Leslie Burke – An intelligent, talented, imaginative, outgoing girl, it is she who creates the imaginary kingdom of Terabithia. Her talents include gymnastics, creative writing, swimming and running. Jesse thinks highly of her, and they are loyal friends. She is a newcomer to his school, and not socially accepted by the other students. She dies when she falls into the creek Jesse and Leslie used to cross into Terabithia after the rope snaps, sustaining a head injury that keeps her unconscious until she drowns.
 May Belle Aarons – One of Jesse's younger sisters. She is described as the only one of his siblings with whom he feels comfortable. However, because she is six years to his 10, she does not fit the mold of the ideal confidante to him, leaving him still desperate for companionship. She is closest to him from the beginning, and like him, feels that she does not have a place in the family. She is the first of his sisters to learn about Terabithia, and becomes the queen after Leslie's death. She is welcomed into his world because of being the only one who to show any sort of empathy for, or acceptance of, him in his family.
 Ellie and Brenda Aarons – Jesse's two older sisters. They primarily exist as secondary static characters, or ones who do not grow or change as a result of the events of a story. They are never mentioned separately within the novel and are never portrayed in a positive light. They continually ask for favors from their mother and boss their younger siblings around.
 Joyce Ann Aarons – Jesse's four-year-old youngest sister. She is mainly tended to by the mother and has no significant role in the story, but as May Belle describes her, she is "nothing but a baby".
 Janice Avery – The school bully at Lark Creek. She is very overweight and tends to become very offended when people tease her for being so. Janice has a crush on Willard Hughes, which Jesse and Leslie use to trick her. Her father beats her and she secretly smokes. Also, her face is used on the giant troll living in Terabithia for the 2007 movie.
 Miss Edmunds – The somewhat unconventional and controversial music teacher, whom Jesse greatly admires. Edmunds invites him to go to the Smithsonian Museum, which leads Leslie to go to Terabithia by herself. As a result, Leslie is alone when she falls from the rope and drowns.
 Prince Terrien – A puppy that Jesse gave Leslie for Christmas. He is the guardian and court jester of Terabithia. In the novel, he is referred to as P.T.
 Gary Fulcher – He and Jesse both hope to be the fastest kid in the fifth grade; he serves as another bully in the story, but he is not quite as mean as Janice Avery.
 Mrs. Myers – Jesse and Leslie's teacher, given the nickname "Monster Mouth Myers." She favors Leslie, and tells Jesse after Leslie's death that she was the best student Myers had ever had. Her husband had also died, and she explains to Jesse a little about grief from her own experience.
 William and Judith (Hancock) Burke – Leslie's parents, novelists who come to the story's location for their work. Mother—book writer, Father—political writer. Unlike most of the locals, they do not watch or own a television. Leslie calls William and Judith "Bill and Judy," respectively.

Reception
At the time of the book's publication, Kirkus Reviews said, "Paterson, who has already earned regard with her historical fiction set in Japan, proves to be just as eloquent and assured when dealing with contemporary American children--and Americans of very different backgrounds at that." According to The Horn Book Magazine, "Jess and his family are magnificently characterized; the book abounds in descriptive vignettes, humorous sidelights on the clash of cultures, and realistic depictions of rural school life. The symbolism of falling and of building bridges forms a theme throughout the story, which is one of remarkable richness and depth, beautifully written." In a retrospective essay about the Newbery Medal-winning books from 1976 to 1985, literary critic Zena Sutherland wrote of Bridge to Terabithia, "The poignant story is all the more effective because Paterson lets Jesse express his grief and guilt rather than telling readers that he feels them. There is no glossing-over; nor is there a reaching for dramatic effect."

Literary significance
The novel's content has been the frequent target of censors. It ranks number 8 on the American Library Association list of most commonly challenged books in the United States for 1990–1999. On the ALA list for 2000–2009 it ranks No. 28. The challenges stem from death being a part of the plot; Jesse's frequent use of the word "lord" outside of prayer;  allegations that it promotes secular humanism, New Age religion, occultism, and Satanism; and for use of offensive language.

The novel is often featured in English studies classes in Ireland, Singapore, Australia, New Zealand, Canada, the Philippines, Ecuador, the United Kingdom, Costa Rica, Panama, South Africa and the United States.

In 2012, the novel was ranked number ten among all-time best children's novels in a survey published by School Library Journal, a monthly with primarily U.S. audience. Two other books by Paterson made the top 100.

Adaptations
Two films have been made based on the novel, both with the original title. One was a PBS TV movie made in 1985, starring Annette O'Toole, Julian Coutts, and Julie Beaulieu.

The second was a theatrical film released on February 16, 2007, directed by the co-creator of Nickelodeon's Rugrats and former Hanna-Barbera animator Gabor Csupo and starring Josh Hutcherson, AnnaSophia Robb, Robert Patrick, Bailee Madison, and Zooey Deschanel; the adaptation was done in part by David Paterson himself. While the giant troll was adapted, the Dark Master, Squogres (a race of squirrel/ogre-like creatures), Hairy Vultures, and many unidentified creatures were created for the film.

A musical stage adaptation ("supported by a lyrical score") entitled The Bridge to Terabithia is listed for sale by Stageplays.com, credited to Paterson and Stephanie S. Tolan, another children's writer. It was catalogued by the Library of Congress in 1993, with primary credit to Steve Liebman for the music, as Bridge to Terabithia: a play with music (New York: S. French, c1992).

See also
Beat the Turtle Drum
Waiting To Dive

References

 Bridge to Terabithia, Hardcover edition

External links

Study guide created by the author (PDF)
"Lisa Hill and the Bridge to Terabithia" by Diana Kohn (PDF)

1977 American novels
1977 fantasy novels
American children's novels
Novels about friendship
Newbery Medal–winning works
Novels set in Virginia
American young adult novels
American fantasy novels adapted into films
Thomas Y. Crowell Co. books
Novels about death
1977 children's books
Censored books
Obscenity controversies in literature
Religious controversies in literature
Works about child death